WKIM (98.9 FM) is a commercial radio station licensed to Munford, Tennessee, and serving the Memphis metropolitan area. It is owned by Cumulus Media and airs a news/talk radio format.

The studios are located on Murray Road at the Memphis Radio Group building in East Memphis.  The transmitter site is in Cordova, Tennessee, off Raleigh-Lagrange Road.  WKIM has an effective radiated power (ERP) of 100,000 watts, the current maximum for American FM stations.

Programming
Weekdays on WKIM have local shows in morning and afternoon drive time, Memphis Morning News and Nation of Jake.  The rest of the schedule is nationally syndicated talk shows, including The Dan Bongino Show, The Ben Shapiro Show, and Ground Zero with Clyde Lewis. Weekends have programs from CBS News Radio, in addition to infomercials and talk show replays.

WKIM carries Tennessee Titans football along with University of Memphis Tigers football, men's basketball, and women's basketball, in addition to seasonal talk shows with the Memphis football and men's basketball coaches.

History

Early years (1948-2001)
The station signed on the air in 1948.  It was in Kennett, Missouri, and used the call sign KTMO.  In 2001, the Federal Communications Commission (FCC) gave it permission to move into the more lucrative Memphis radio market.

Smooth jazz (2001-2004) 
After its relocation, it began playing smooth jazz as "Smooth Jazz 98.9" WJZN.  That lasted three years.

Rhythmic (2004-2006) 
In November 2004, the station changed to a rhythmic contemporary format as WMPW, "Power 99", putting it in competition with urban contemporary WHRK, rhythmic KXHT and mainstream top 40 WHBQ-FM.

Adult hits (2006-2010)

On September 15, 2006, at 2 p.m., WMPW flipped to a female-leaning adult hits format as "98-9 Kim FM" under new call letters WKIM. The first song on "Kim FM" was Like a Prayer by Madonna.  After several books of substandard ratings, about a year later, the station flipped formats to Hot AC.  The change still did not draw enough listeners.

'90s hits (2010-2011) 
On March 31, 2010, at 5 p.m., the format was flipped to 1990s hits as Gen X 98-9. The first song on "Gen X 98.9" was Losing My Religion by R.E.M.  By that autumn, the station added some current hits, making it a 1990s/Hot AC hybrid format.

News/talk (2011-2015)
On April 25, 2011, the station switched to a talk format, branded as "News/Talk 98.9".  Because the station is owned by Cumulus Media, many of the shows heard on News/Talk 98.9 were from the co-owned Westwood One Network.

Classic hip hop (2015-2017) 
On February 27, 2015, at Noon, WKIM flipped to classic hip-hop, branded as "98.9 The Vibe." The first song on "The Vibe" was "Hip Hop Hooray" by Naughty by Nature. WKIM was one of two stations in the market airing the format; WIVG was the other. (That station has since flipped back to alternative rock).

Adult contemporary (2017-2021) 
On October 31, 2017, at Noon, WKIM began stunting with Christmas music as "Christmas 98.9."  On December 26, at 6 a.m., WKIM flipped to adult contemporary as "98.9 The Bridge."  The switch puts WKIM in competition with Entercom-owned WRVR, one of Memphis' leading radio stations.  From early November until the Christmas holidays, WKIM switched to all-Christmas music.  Weekday mornings, WKIM carried the syndicated Bob & Sheri Show from WLNK in Charlotte.

Talk (2021-present)
On May 25, 2021, Cumulus Media announced a five-year agreement to carry University of Memphis Tigers athletics on WKIM.  The Tigers had previously been heard on iHeartMedia's WREC 600 AM and WEGR 102.7 FM. Concurrently, it was also announced WKIM would flip back to a talk radio format as "News/Talk 98.9, The Roar of Memphis".

WKIM also became the Memphis affiliate for the Tennessee Titans Radio Network.  In addition, WKIM affiliated with CBS Radio News for world and national news coverage.

References

External links
News Talk 98.9 official website

KIM
KIM
Cumulus Media radio stations
News and talk radio stations in the United States
Conservative talk radio